Zone Romantica (formerly Romantica) was a European TV channel that launched in 1998. The channel broadcast a mixture of telenovelas, music and entertainment from all over the world, but mainly from Latin America. The channel was available 24 hours a day, to 20 territories across Europe and the Middle East. The channel reached 8 million subscribers.

The channel launched on Sky Digital in the UK and Ireland on 3 September 2007. It was broadcasting between 8 a.m. and 3 a.m. from the start. It slot on the Sky EPG had been purchased from BEN TV.

On 6 May 2008 it was one of the channels that were on the free-to-air platform Freesat platform from the start.

On 14 September 2009, it was revealed that the international arm of CBS, CBS Studios International, struck a joint venture deal with Chellomedia to launch six CBS-branded channels in the UK during 2009. The new channels would replace Zone Romantica, Zone Thriller, Zone Horror and Zone Reality, plus timeshift services Zone Horror +1 and Zone Reality +1. On 1 October 2009, it was announced that CBS Reality, CBS Reality +1, CBS Drama and CBS Action would launch on 16 November 2009 replacing Zone Reality, Zone Reality +1, Zone Romantica and Zone Thriller. On 5 April 2010, Zone Horror and Zone Horror +1 were rebranded as Horror Channel and Horror Channel +1, following the rebrand of the portfolio's other three channels in November 2009.

On 2 July 2012, Hungarian version of Zone Romantica is replaced by Film Café. On 1 August 2012 Chellomedia revealed that all European versions of the Zone Channels would be rebranded into CBS Channels. CBS Action replaced Zone Romantica on 3 December 2012.

Programming
Programme Line-up for UK/Éire features 3 Classic First Run US Daytime Soap Operas.

Current shows 
 A escrava Isaura
 Amazônia, de Galvez a Chico Mendes
 Aunque mal paguen
 ¿Dónde está Elisa?
 El encantador
 Hilda Furacão
 La quiero a morir
 Los misterios del amor
 Mulher
 Muñoz vale por 2
 Pocholo
 Sabrosa pasion
 Sabrosa pasion plus
 Salvador de mujeres
 Vivir asi
 Voltea pa' que te enamores
 La diosa Coronada

References

External links
Zone Romantica Official Website

AMC Networks International
Television channels in the United Kingdom
Defunct television channels in Hungary
Television channels and stations established in 1998
Television channels and stations established in 2006
Television channels and stations disestablished in 2009
Television channels and stations disestablished in 2012
Defunct television channels in the United Kingdom